Rafael Alcaide Crespín (born 25 May 1948), known as Crispi,  is a Spanish footballer. He competed in the men's tournament at the 1968 Summer Olympics.

References

External links
 
 BDFutbol Profile

1948 births
Living people
Spanish footballers
Olympic footballers of Spain
Footballers at the 1968 Summer Olympics
Footballers from Córdoba, Spain
Association football forwards